Zac Hosking (born 26 February 1997)  is an Australian rugby league footballer who plays as a  forward for the Penrith Panthers in the NRL.

He previously played for the Brisbane Broncos in the National Rugby League.

Background
Hosking played his junior rugby league for the Central Charlestown Butcher Boys.

Playing career

2022
Hosking made his first grade debut for Brisbane against St. George Illawarra in round 17 of the 2022 NRL season.

2023
On 18 February, Hosking played in Penrith's 13-12 upset loss to St Helens RFC in the 2023 World Club Challenge.

References

External links
 Broncos profile

1997 births
Living people
Australian rugby league players
Brisbane Broncos players
Rugby league players from Sydney
Rugby league second-rows
Wynnum Manly Seagulls players